The S. B. Barker Building, also known as the Dunn Brothers Building, is a historic commercial building in Condon, Oregon, United States.

Built in 1903 adjacent to a spring at the center of downtown Condon, this Italianate general store typifies the mercantile businesses serving ranches and farms throughout eastern Oregon in the early part of the 20th century.

Its early proprietors, Simon Bradbury Barker (owner 1903–1918) and James Dunn Burns (owner 1926–1968), were leading economic and political figures in Gilliam County, and Barker became a prominent businessman statewide.

Despite its initially central location, the building came to be on the south edge of downtown as the business district migrated north to meet the railroad.

The building was added to the National Register of Historic Places in 1989.

See also
National Register of Historic Places listings in Gilliam County, Oregon

References

External links

Buildings and structures in Gilliam County, Oregon
National Register of Historic Places in Gilliam County, Oregon
Buildings and structures completed in 1903
1903 establishments in Oregon
Italianate architecture in Oregon
Historic district contributing properties in Oregon